The 2013 World Ringette Championships (2013 WRC) was an international ringette tournament and the 10th (X) World Ringette Championships. The tournament was organized by the International Ringette Federation (IRF)and was contested in North Bay, Ontario, Canada, between December 31, 2013, and January 4, 2014. The main competition took place at the North Bay Memorial Gardens.

WRC 2013 was the first time the World Junior Ringette Championships, known as the U19 World Ringette Championship, was added to the program after it had initially begun as a separate tournament. The previous year the 2012 World Junior Ringette Championships took place for elite junior ringette athletes but was organized as separate event from the World Ringette Championships program.

Overview
Team Canada Senior and Team Finland Senior competed against each other in a best of three series. Team Sweden, Team USA, Team Canada U19, and Team Finland U19 competed in the President's Pool and for the U19 (Under-19) world title.

Sam Jacks Series 

Team Canada Senior and Team Finland Senior competed for the World Championship title in the Senior competition called the "Sam Jacks Series", named after Sam Jacks, the inventor of ringette. The series was played in a best-of-three playoff format. The winner of the Senior division, Team Finland Senior, claimed the Sam Jacks Trophy.

Presidents' Pool and U19 World Ringette Championship
Team Sweden, Team USA, Team Canada U19 and Team Finland U19 competed in the Presidents' Pool. It was played in a round-robin series with the top team claiming the President's Trophy.

Team Sweden and Team USA also played for the World Ringette Championship bronze medal. Team Canada U19 and Team Finland U19 played for the U19 World Championship title.

Venue

Teams

Game results

Sam Jacks Series 
The "Sam Jacks Series" was the name of the 2013 WRC Senior Pool.

Top scorers

Presidents' Pool

Points

Bronze Medal Game

U19 World Championship 

The U19 World Championship title game resulted in a win for the Finland Juniors (U19).

Final standings

Senior Pool results 

The Senior Pool competition, also known as the "Sam Jacks Series", was a three-game series between Team Canada Senior and Team Finland Senior. Team Finland Senior won the Sam Jacks Series 2–0 and was rewarded with the gold medal and the Sam Jacks Trophy. Team USA defeated Team Sweden to claim the bronze.

Junior Pool results 
The Junior Pool competition was a three-game series between Team Canada Junior and Team Finland Junior. Finland won the U19 World Championship title.

President's Pool results 
The President's Pool involved junior (U19) athletes from Team Canada Junior and Team Finland Junior competing with the developing ringette countries. The winning team, Finland U19, was rewarded with a gold medal and the President's Trophy.

Rosters

Seniors

Team Finland Senior
The 2013 Team Finland Senior team included the following:

Team Canada Senior
The 2013 Team Canada Senior team competed in the 2013 World Ringette Championships. The world championship event marked the 50th anniversary of ringette. The U19 World Ringette Championship, was added to the program for the first time that same tournament.

The 2013 Team Canada Senior team included the following:

Team Sweden Senior
The 2013 Sweden Senior team included the following:

Team USA Senior
The 2013 USA Senior team included the following:

Juniors

Team Finland Junior
The 2013 Team Finland Junior team included the following:

Team Canada Junior
The 2013 Team Canada Junior team included the following:

See also
 World Ringette Championships
 International Ringette Federation
  Canada national ringette team
  Finland national ringette team
  Sweden national ringette team
  United States national ringette team

References

External links 
2013 World Ringette Championships Official Homepage

2013 World Ringette Championships at Ringette Canada Official Homepage 

Ringette
Ringette competitions
World Ringette Championships
International sports competitions hosted by Canada
World Ringette Championships
World Ringette Championships
World Ringette Championships
Sport in Ontario